Luigi Serventi (31 July 1885 – 18 August 1976) was an Italian film actor.

Partial filmography

 Il prezzo del perdono (1913)
 Bianco contro negro (1913)
 La lega dei diamanti (1913)
 La parola che uccide (1914)
 La dote del burattinaio (1914)
 Dopo il veglione (1914)
 Vizio atavico (1914)
 La conquista dei diamanti (1914)
 La fuga degli amanti (1914)
 Mezzanotte (1915)
 Passa la guerra (1915)
 Il figlio della guerra (1916)
 La piccola ombra (1916)
 The Courier of Moncenisio (1916)
 Cavalleria rusticana (1916)
 Il malefico anello (1916)
 Mimì e gli straccioni (1916)
 La crociata degli innocenti (1917)
 Il re, le Torri e gli Alfieri (1917) - Rolando, re di Fantasia
 La Bohème (1917)
 Le mogli e le arance (1917) - Marquis Marcello
 Napoleoncina (1918)
 Il giardino incantato (1918)
 The Railway Owner (1919) - Duca di Bligny
 Noris (1919)
 A Woman's Story (1920) - Paolo
 La bambola e l'amore (1920)
 Hereny Vencida (1920)
 The Story of a Poor Young Man (1920) - Massimo
 Il volto di Medusa (1920)
 La storia di una cigaretta (1921)
 Il mercante di emozioni (1921)
 Suprema bellezza (1921)
 La mirabile visione (1921)
 Marito, moglie e... (1921)
 A Dying Nation (1922, part 1, 2)
 La Boheme (1923) - Vicomte Paul
 The Money Devil (1923) - Marquis Redonc
 Der Tiger des Zirkus Farini (1923)
 Bob und Mary (1923)
 Muz bez srdce (1923) - Roger Lynne
 Darling of the King (1924)
 La moglie bella (1924)
 The Story of Lilian Hawley (1925) - Jonny
 La via del peccato (1925)
 Love's Finale (1925) - Graf Ermete Chassard
 Voglio tradire mio marito (1925) - Lo scapolo impenitente
 The Sun Disciples (1926) - Radim Sylvan / Viktor Sylvan
 Maciste in the Lion's Cage (1926) - Strasser
 Her Husband's Wife (1926)
 The Giant of the Dolomites (1927) - Müller, l'avventurieno
 Caught in Berlin's Underworld (1927) - Graf Egglio
 Die raffinierteste Frau Berlins (1927) - Henrik Svensen
 The Man with the Limp (1928) - McHenning, Völkerbund-Delegierter
 The President (1928) - Don Germo / Geronimo Cortez
 Vienna, City of My Dreams (1928) - Prinzgemahl
 Leontine's Husbands (1928)
 The Confessions of a Woman (1928)
 A Girl with Temperament (1928) - Prinz Solm
 Erotikon (1929) - Jean
 The Storyteller of Venice (1929)
 The White Roses of Ravensberg (1929) - von Kurla
 Ship of Girls (1929)
 Mountains on Fire (1931) - Arthur Franchini, sein Freund
 Militiaman Bruggler (1936) - Italian officer (final film role)

Bibliography
 Vacche, Angela Dalle. Diva: Defiance and Passion in Early Italian Cinema. University of Texas Press, 2008.

External links

1885 births
1976 deaths
Italian male film actors
Italian male silent film actors
Male actors from Rome
20th-century Italian male actors